The 2002–03 Troy State Trojans men's basketball team represented Troy University during the 2002–03 NCAA Division I men's basketball season. The Trojans, led by 21st-year head coach Don Maestri, played their home games at Trojan Arena in Troy, Alabama and were members of the Sun Belt Conference. They finished the season 26–6, 14–2 in Sun Belt play to finish atop the conference regular season standings. They defeated Samford, Georgia State, and Central Florida to win the Sun Belt tournament championship. As a result, they received the conference's automatic bid to the NCAA tournament  the first in program history. As the No. 14 seed in the South region, they were beaten by Xavier in the opening round.

Roster

Schedule and results

|-
!colspan=9 style=| Non-conference regular season

|-
!colspan=9 style=| Sun Belt Conference regular season

|-
!colspan=9 style=| ASUN tournament

|-
!colspan=9 style=| NCAA tournament

References

Troy Trojans men's basketball seasons
Troy State
Troy State
2002 in sports in Alabama
2003 in sports in Alabama